Farrer Hall is the second oldest of the residential colleges of Monash University, located in the city of Melbourne, Victoria, Australia. It is home to 200 residents, a third of which are usually first year students. The hall is divided into two sections: Commons and Lords.

History
The House of Commons was opened in May 1965, while the House of Lords was built the following year. The House of Commons was intended for undergraduates while the House of Lords was for Honours and Master students. This distinction no longer applies. The college had its own dining hall in its early years.

Buildings
The hall comprises two separate three-storey buildings, "Commons" and "Lords", containing a main common room, several kitchens open to use by individuals or small groups, study centre, social room, poolroom, music and TV rooms and a secure bicycle enclosure. Each floor of each building, along with bathroom and laundry, has a small lounge with facilities for self-catering. In "Commons", one room and a bathroom have been modified for the use of residents with a physical disability.

Most of Farrer's facilities and activities are coordinated by the Resident Advisors and students. In the general life of the Hall, especially the social life, a leading role is played by the elected executive committee of the Farrer Hall Society, of which all residents are members. There is also a Floor Representatives' group comprising one student from each floor, and this group meets approximately twice a semester with the College Head and Deputy College Head to discuss the needs of students in the Hall.

References

External links
Farrer Hall website

Monash University
Buildings and structures in the City of Monash
1965 establishments in Australia
Residential colleges of Australian universities